Daniel Mica (born February 4, 1944) is an American politician who was a U.S. representative from the state of Florida.

Education
Daniel Mica attended the University of Florida, but received his Bachelor of Arts degree from Florida Atlantic University in 1966. He was subsequently awarded an honorary Doctor of Laws degree from the same institution. He also holds an honorary law degree from Barry University.

During his time at FAU he served as the university's first student government president.

Career

Politics
From 1968 to 1978, Daniel Mica was the Chief of Staff to Congressman Paul Rogers. He succeeded Rogers in 1979 and subsequently served five terms in the U.S. House of Representatives representing Florida's 11th district

As a five-term member of the U.S. House of Representatives, Mica served his home state of Florida from 1979 to 1989 and made his mark as a bipartisan consensus-builder. He was on the House Foreign Affairs Committee, Select Committee on Aging, and Veteran's Affairs Committee. He also served in the House leadership as deputy whip; and he was a member of the U.S. Secretary of State's Commission on Terrorism (the "Inman Commission").

His accomplishments while in Congress include investigating management corruption at the largest government-funded health maintenance organization (HMO) in the country, authoring anti-terrorism legislation that was enacted into law and reorganizing the federal court system by adding a new court district that helped relieve the system's backlog of cases.

While serving in Congress, Mica was appointed by President Ronald Reagan to be congressional representative to the United Nations. President Bush appointed him to the board for International Broadcasting in 1991, and President Bill Clinton selected him to serve as chairman of the board of Radio Free Europe/Radio Liberty in 1993.

In 1988 Mica ran for the U.S. Senate seat being vacated by Lawton Chiles. Mica finished 3rd in the Democratic primary.

After leaving Capitol Hill, Mica joined the American Council of Life Insurers in 1989 as an executive vice president specializing in Federal Affairs. He remained in this position until 1996.

Credit Union National Association
In July 1996, Mica was named president and chief executive officer of the Credit Union National Association (CUNA).

Family
Mica is married, has four children. He is the brother of politician John Mica, a Republican who represented Florida's 7th Congressional District from 1993 until 2017. His daughter, Christine, is the current Dean of University Admissions for The Catholic University of America.

References

External links
Daniel Mica Congressional Bio
Credit Union National Association Official Website
CUNA's Profile of Daniel A. Mica
The DMA Group Official Website

1944 births
Living people
Florida Atlantic University alumni
Democratic Party members of the United States House of Representatives from Florida
University of Florida alumni
Politicians from Binghamton, New York
People from West Palm Beach, Florida
Members of Congress who became lobbyists